Gunz may refer to:

Games 
 GunZ: The Duel, a 2005 South Korean online third-person shooting game
 GunZ 2, a 2011 South Korean fighting video game, sequel to GunZ: The Duel

Places 

 Günz, a river in Bavaria, Germany
 Östliche Günz, or "eastern Günz," a river in Bavaria, Germany
 Westliche Günz, or "western Günz," a river in Bavaria, Germany
 Günz Glacial Stage, name for an early Pleistocene stage used in the Alps

Music 
 Gunz n' Butta, a 2011 collaborative album by Cam'ron and Vado
 Lord Tariq and Peter Gunz, American rap duo
 Young Gunz, American rap duo

People 
 Cory Gunz (born 1987), American rapper from The Bronx, New York City, New York
 Gabriele Günz (born 1961), retired East German high jumper
  (born 1946), German entrepreneur

See also 
 Gun (disambiguation)